General Sir Peter Edgar de la Cour de la Billière,  (born 29 April 1934) is a former British Army officer who was Director SAS during the Iranian Embassy siege, and Commander-in-Chief of the British forces in Operation Granby (the Gulf War).

Early years
Peter de la Billière was born in Plymouth, Devon, the son of Surgeon Lieutenant Commander Claude Denis Delacour de Labillière and his wife, Frances Christine Wright ("Kitty") Lawley. On 22 May 1941 his father, who had been educated at Monkton Combe School near Bath, Somerset, was killed when his ship, was sunk by German bombers in an attack south-west of Crete.

De la Billière was educated at St Peter's Court School, in Broadstairs, Kent, and Harrow School. A "Peter de la Billière" is mentioned as pupil evacuee of St Peter's Court sent to Crediton, Devon in Our Land at War by Duff Hart-Davis.

Military career
De la Billière originally enlisted as a private in the King's Shropshire Light Infantry in 1952. He was later commissioned as a second lieutenant into the Durham Light Infantry. During his early career as an officer he served in Japan, Korea and Egypt with the regiment's 1st Battalion.

Special Air Service Regiment
In 1956, de la Billière attended and passed Selection for the Special Air Service. During his first SAS tour, he served in Malaya during the Malayan Emergency, as well as Oman where he was mentioned in despatches and was awarded the Military Cross in 1959 for leading a troop in the assault on Jebel Akdar. After his initial tour with 22 SAS, he returned to the Durham Light Infantry to run recruit training, before taking up the post of Adjutant of 21 SAS – the London-based Territorial Army (reserve) SAS regiment. In 1962, he was attached to the Federal Army in Aden. In 1964, he failed Staff College but was appointed Officer Commanding A Squadron 22 SAS. From 1964 to 1966, A Squadron 22 SAS was deployed to Borneo where he was second-in-command of the regiment for the Indonesia-Malaysia confrontation. For his actions during this period he was awarded a bar to his Military Cross.

After this tour, de la Billière re-attended Staff College, and, this time, passed. After Staff College he was posted as G2 (intelligence) Special Forces at Army Strategic Command. He then served a tour as second-in-command of 22 SAS, of which he was Commanding Officer from 1972 to 1974. For service in Oman, he was awarded the Distinguished Service Order (DSO) in 1976 for his actions in the battles at Musandam and Dhofar.

De la Billière then served from 1977 in a number of administrative posts assuming command of the British Army Training Team in Sudan before returning to the regiment as Director SAS in 1979. For the next four years he commanded SAS Group with overall responsibility for military command.  It was during this period that the Special Air Service Regiment became publicly known as a consequence of their storming of the Iranian Embassy in 1980. He was also responsible during the Falklands War for planning Operation Mikado. In 1982, he was appointed a Commander of the Order of the British Empire (CBE).

Regular service commands
After the SAS, de la Billière was appointed Military Commissioner and Commander of British Forces in the Falkland Islands from 1984 and General Officer Commanding Wales District from 1985. He was succeeded by Brigadier Morgan Llewellyn on 1 December 1987. In 1987 he was appointed Knight Commander of the Order of the Bath (KCB). He was General Officer Commanding South East District from 1988.

Despite being due for retirement de la Billière was appointed on 6 October 1990 as Commander-in-Chief of British Forces in Operation Granby (the Gulf War), in effect the second-in-command of the multinational military coalition headed by US General Norman Schwarzkopf Jr. His experience of fighting in the area, knowledge of the people and possession of some fluency in Arabic overrode concerns about his age.  In this role he was largely responsible for persuading Schwarzkopf (who was initially sceptical) to allow the use of SAS and other special forces in significant roles in the conflict. The British army contingent expanded from 14,000 early in November 1990 to more than 45,000 through to completion of the engagement and cessation of hostilities in February 1991. In 1991, he was appointed Knight Commander of the Order of the British Empire (KBE) and in August that year, de la Billière received Canada's Meritorious Service Cross.

By the end of his career de la Billière had risen to the rank of general, and became a special adviser to the Secretary of State for Defence on Middle East military matters.  In order to allow him to receive the pension benefits of full general he was given the newly created sinecurist (honorarium) post of Middle East Advisor to the Secretary of State for Defence. He retired in June 1992.

Later life
In 1993, he received Saudi Arabia's Order of King Abdulaziz, 2nd Class, and was made a Chief Commander of the United States' Legion of Merit.

De la Billière has written or co-authored 18 books, including an autobiography, a personal account of the Gulf War and a number of works about the SAS.

In 1965, he married Bridget Constance Muriel Goode. They have one son and two daughters.

References

Further reading

External links
Interview with Peter de la Billière National Army Museum
The Papers of Sir Peter de la Billière held at Churchill Archives Centre

|-
 

|-
 

|-

1934 births
Living people
British Army generals
Companions of the Distinguished Service Order
Deputy Lieutenants of Herefordshire
Durham Light Infantry officers
King's Shropshire Light Infantry soldiers
Knights Commander of the Order of the Bath
Knights Commander of the Order of the British Empire
Recipients of the Meritorious Service Decoration
People educated at Harrow School
Chief Commanders of the Legion of Merit
Special Air Service officers
British Army personnel of the Gulf War
British military leaders of the Gulf War
British Army personnel of the Korean War
British Army personnel of the Malayan Emergency
British Army personnel of the Indonesia–Malaysia confrontation
Recipients of the Military Cross
Graduates of the Staff College, Camberley
Military personnel from Plymouth, Devon